Captain Fracasse (French:Le capitaine Fracasse) may refer to:

 Captain Fracasse (novel), an 1863 novel by Théophile Gautier
 Captain Fracasse (1919 film), an Italian silent film 
 Captain Fracasse (1929 film), a French silent film 
 Captain Fracasse (1940 film), an Italian film
 Captain Fracasse (1943 film), a French-Italian film 
 Captain Fracasse (1961 film), a French-Italian film

See Also
 Captain Fracassa's Journey (Il viaggio di Capitan Fracassa) a 1990 Italian film based on the novel Captain Fracasse
 Il Capitano alias Captain Fracassa, a stock character in the Commedia dell'arte
 The High Priestess a variant of Tarot Card trump number II called The Spanish Captain Fracasse